The 2021 Derry Senior Football Championship was the 98th edition of Derry GAA's premier gaelic football tournament for the top clubs. The sixteen teams who qualified for the 2021 senior championship (12 Division 1A teams and four Division 1B teams) are explained in the 'Competition Format' section below.

The 2020 Derry senior championship format was changed as a result of the COVID-19 pandemic. Teams competed in an initial group stage where each team played three games before playing at least one game in the first knockout stage. The 2021 Championship followed a similar format.

Relegation playoffs were introduced in 2021. Newbridge lost their relegation quarter final against Claudy by 0-13 to 0-12 and were initially relegated to Division 1B for 2022. Banagher won their relegation quarter final against Dungiven by 1-09 to 0-09 and were promoted to Division 1A for 2022. At the start of the 2022 season the leagues were restructured. Division 1A was expanded from twelve to sixteen teams and renamed the Derry Senior League. Banagher, Dungiven, Kilrea and Steelstown (the 2021 intermediate champions) were the four additional teams.

Glen beat the defending champions Slaughtneil by 1-13 to 0-07 at Celtic Park, Derry to win a their first senior championship.

The winners received the John McLaughlin Cup.

Competition Format 

Senior Championships

2020 Format

Initially the sixteen teams were drawn into four groups of four teams. Each team were guaranteed three group games and at least one knockout game. All sixteen teams qualified for the knock-out stages. In the first round draw the teams were seeded from the group stage with the group winners playing the teams who finished fourth and the group runner-ups playing the teams who finished third. The quarter final draw was open but subject to the restriction that repeat pairings be avoided if possible. The semi final draw was open.

2021 Format

In the leagues, Division 1a and 1b teams played 11 league games and Division 2 teams played13 league games. With the new condensed intercounty season coming into effect, club league games played without county players until their involvement with the respective intercounty competitions comes to an end. The team finishing top of the league at the end of 11/13 games won their respective league.

Due to the move towards the split season model, which has been adopted by GAA nationally, 2021 will see club leagues decoupled from Championship, with matters of promotion and relegation decided via the championship competitions. 2021 Championship groups are based on 2020 Championship placings. Each group will contain one semi-finalist, one beaten quarter-finalist and two beaten last 16 teams.

Each team will be guaranteed three group games and at least one knockout game. The games will be played on a group basis (Home, Away & Neutral fixture). If any club cannot field the game will be forfeited. All sixteen teams qualify for the knock-out stages. In the first knockout round draw the teams were seeded from the group stage with the group winners playing the teams who finished fourth and the group runner-ups playing the teams who finished third. The quarter final draw was subject to the restriction that repeat pairings be avoided if possible.

The teams progress in this years championship will be used to determine their 2022 league placings. Once the groups games have been played and the last 16 knock out round is complete, the winning teams will continue to the quarter finals and the losing teams will progress to therelegation quarter finals. The losers of the relegation final will also be relegated from the 2022 SFC at the expense of the 2021 IFC.
 
2022

Division 1A in 2022 will made up of 8 SFC Quarter-final teams plus the 4 winners of the SFC Relegation Quarter-finals. The loser

Recent history of relegations and promotions

Relegations and promotions in 2021 

All promotions and relegations in 2021 were initially decided by performances in the 2021 senior championship and the relegation playoffs. Before the 2022 season began, Division 1A was renamed as the Derry Senior League and expanded from twelve to sixteen teams. This meant that some of the relegations from the 2021 Division 1A were reversed.

Senior Championship
 Foreglen conceded before the relegation semi final playoffs and were automatically relegated to the 2022 intermediate championship, thus making the relegation semi finals and final unnecessary.
 Steelstown beat Greenlough by 0-09 0-08 in the intermediate championship final. Steelstown replaced Foreglen in the 2022 senior championship.

Divisions 1A & 1B
 Banagher beat Dungiven by 1-09 to 0-09 in a relegation quarter final playoff. Banagher were promoted to Division 1A. Dungiven initially remained in Division 1B. In 2022, Division 1A was renamed as the Derry Senior League and expanded from twelve to sixteen teams. Dungiven were promoted to the expanded senior league.
 Claudy beat Newbridge by 0-13 to 0-12 in a relegation quarter final playoff. Claudy remained in Division 1A. Newbridge were initially relegated to Division 1B. In 2022, Division 1A was renamed as the Derry Senior League and expanded from twelve to sixteen teams. Newbridge were promoted to the expanded senior league.
 Kilrea initially remained in Division 1B. In 2022, Division 1A was renamed as the Derry Senior League and expanded from twelve to sixteen teams. Kilrea were promoted to the expanded senior league.
 Steelstown initially remained in Division 1B. In 2022, Division 1A was renamed as the Derry Senior League and expanded from twelve to sixteen teams. Steelstown were promoted to the expanded senior league because they won the 2021 Derry Intermediate Championship.

Relegations and promotions in 2020 

There were no promotions or relegations from the senior championship or leagues in 2020 due to the public health measures introduced to combat COVID-19.

Relegations and promotions in 2019 

Senior Championship

All twelve teams in the 2019 Division 1A automatically qualified for the 2020 senior championship. Four 2019 Division 1B teams also qualified for the 2020 senior football championship –

 Claudy finished 1st in 2019 Division 1B with 19 points.
 Newbridge finished 2nd in 2019 Division 1B with 17 points.
 Kilrea finished 3rd in 2019 Division 1B with 14 points.
 Foreglen won the intermediate championship, defeating Claudy by 0-15 to 0-09. Foreglen took the place in the 2020 ( and in 2021 due to Covid) senior championship reserved for the 2019 intermediate champions instead of Greenlough who finished 4th in 2019 Division 1B with 14 points.

League

Two teams were relegated from Division 1A and were replaced by two teams from Division 1B –

 Dungiven finished 11th in 2019 Division 1A with 3 points. They were relegated but retained the right to play in the 2020 senior football championship.
 Banagher finished 12th in 2019 Division 1A with 0 points. They were relegated but retained the right to play in the 2020 senior football championship.
 Claudy finished 1st in 2019 Division 1B with 19 points and were promoted.
 Newbridge finished 2nd in 2019 Division 1B with 17 points and were promoted.

Senior Championship Group Stage

The draw for the group stage was held on Thursday 5 August 2021.

Group A

Group B

Group C

Group D

Senior Championship Full Draw

First Knockout Round

Group ranking was used to decide the draw – 1v4 and 2v3. The eight winning teams progress to the quarter finals and are assigned to Division 1A for 2022. The eight losing teams enter the relegation playoffs with the four losing teams in the relegation quarter finals assigned to Division 1B for 2022.

The draw took place on 26 September 2021.

Quarter-finals 
Teams who played in the same group cannot be drawn against each other. The Quarter-final Draw took place on Sunday 10 October after the Slaughtneil/Dungiven match.

Semi-finals 
The semi final pairings were determined by an open draw without restrictions. The draw was made after the Glen v Swatragh match on Sunday 17 October.

Lavey versus Slaughtneil was a repeat pairing from Group C Round 2 on 18 September 2021 at Owenbeg - Lavey won that game by 2-07 to 0-10.

Final

Relegation playoffs

Relegation Quarter-finals 

The eight losing teams from the first knockout round competed in the 2021 relegation quarter finals. Initially the four losing teams were planned to be assigned to Division 1B for 2022 and the remaining twelve senior championship teams were planned to be assigned to Division 1A for 2022. Subsequently Derry GAA expanded the top division to sixteen teams for 2022 and renamed it the Senior League. Fifteen of the sixteen teams who competed in the 2021 senior championship were assigned to the new senior league for 2022. Foreglen were assigned to the intermediate league for 2022 and the 2021 intermediate champions, Steelstown, took their place in the new senior league.

The four teams with the highest number of points from the group stage were drawn against the four teams with the lowest points. Repeat fixtures from the group stage were not permitted. The relegation quarter final draw took place after the Newbridge/Bellaghy re-fixture on Tuesday 10 October 2021.

Relegation Semi-finals (cancelled) 

The relegation semi finals would have been played between the losers of the relegation quarter finals. Foreglen conceded and were automatically relegated to the 2022 intermediate championship, thus making the relegation semi finals and final unnecessary.

Relegation Final (cancelled) 

The relegation finals would have been played between the losers of the relegation semi finals. The losing team would have been relegated to the 2022 intermediate championship. Foreglen conceded and were automatically relegated to the 2022 intermediate championship, thus making the relegation semi finals and final unnecessary.

The 2021 intermediate champions, Steelstown, were promoted to the 2022 senior championship.

Top Scorer 
Main Championship only (Relegation playoff games not included)
Quarter-finals completed

References 

Derry Senior Football Championship
Derry Senior Football Championship
Derry Senior Football Championship
Derry SFC
Derry Senior Football Championship